Graham John Griffiths (born 5 November 1944) is an association football player who represented New Zealand at international level.

Griffiths made his full All Whites debut in a 0–0 draw New Caledonia on 25 July 1969 and ended his international playing career with 12 A-international caps to his credit, his final cap an appearance in a 2–0 win over China on 26 July 1975.

Griffiths is one of a very small number of players to have gained four Chatham Cup winners' medals, as part of the Christchurch United team in 1972, 1974, 1975, and 1976.

References

External links 

1944 births
Living people
New Zealand association footballers
New Zealand international footballers
Association football defenders